Lee Ki-ho (born 15 July 1970) is a South Korean retired handballer who played at the 1992 Olympic Games.

In 2017, he coached the SK Sugar Gliders to the Women's Handball Korea League title.

References

1970 births
South Korean male handball players
Olympic handball players of South Korea
Handball players at the 1992 Summer Olympics
Asian Games medalists in handball
Handball players at the 1990 Asian Games
Handball players at the 1994 Asian Games
Asian Games gold medalists for South Korea
Medalists at the 1990 Asian Games
Medalists at the 1994 Asian Games
Living people
20th-century South Korean people